Boan may refer to:

People
 Boan Venter (born 1997), South African rugby player
 Christophe Boan, French curler
 Harry Boan (1860–1941), Australian businessman and politician, founder of Boans
 Pierre Boan (1925–2011), French curler

Other uses
 Boan languages, a proposed group of Bantu languages
 , a village in Šavnik

See also
 Boann, Irish goddess
 Boans, a defunct Australian department store chain